Gebhard Woods State Park is an Illinois state park on  in Grundy County, Illinois, United States. Originally was owned by Mrs. William Gebhard, but was bought by the Grundy County Rod & Gun Club in 1934. After paying the $1,500.00, the Rod and Gun club donated the land to Illinois to create the Gebhard Woods State Park.

See also
 The Shabbona Trail goes through Channahon State Park and ends in Gebhard Woods State Park.

References

External links

 National Park Service Illinois & Michigan Canal
 Gebhard Woods State Park

State parks of Illinois
Protected areas of Grundy County, Illinois
Protected areas established in 1934
1934 establishments in Illinois